Juraqan (also Romanized as Jūraqān, Jarūqān, and Jowraqān; also known as Jooraghan, Jūrūghan, and Jūzghān) is a city in the Central District of Hamadan County, Hamadan Province, Iran. At the 2006 census, its population was 8,851, in 2,311 families.

References

Populated places in Hamadan County

Cities in Hamadan Province